The Pack is an American reality competition streaming television series hosted by Lindsey Vonn. It premiered on Amazon Prime Video on November 20, 2020.

Background
The series features 12 dogs and their human owners traveling around the world to compete in various challenges including tugging, pulling, scent work, and more. The dogs and their owners are accompanied by veterinarians and dog experts to make sure the contestants are kept safe. The winning duo receives a $500,000 prize, with an additional $250,000 going to a charity of their choice. The series has been described as The Amazing Race with dogs.

Production
In August 2019, Amazon Studios greenlit the series, with Olympic gold medal skier Lindsey Vonn as the host. It also features Vonn's dog Lucy. The show is executive produced by Jay Bienstock, Jay Renfroe, and David Garfinkle. It was filmed across eight countries in early 2020, prior to the COVID-19 restrictions. In January 2021, the series was canceled after one season.

Contestants

Episodes

Eliminations and winner

Color Key
 Team was a member of the Green Pack
 Team was a member of the Blue Pack
 Team was a member of the winning Pack in the Pack Challenge.
 Team was a member of the losing Pack in the Pack Challenge, but survived the Elimination Challenge
 Team was eliminated.
 Team won immunity from the final Elimination Challenge.
 Contestant was the 2nd runner up
 Contestant was the 1st runner up.
 Contestant was the series winner.

+ Contestant lost the elimination challenge but was not sent home due to another contestant violating safety guidelines
‡ Contestant won the elimination challenge but was sent home for violating dog/partner safety guidelines.

Release
The teaser trailer was released on October 6, 2020, and the official trailer was released on November 9, 2020. The Pack premiered on Amazon Prime Video on November 20, 2020.

References

External links 
 
 

Amazon Prime Video original programming
English-language television shows
2020 American television series debuts
2020 American television series endings
2020s American reality television series
Television series by Amazon Studios
Television shows about dogs
Television shows filmed in California
Television shows filmed in Mexico
Television shows filmed in Costa Rica
Television shows filmed in Austria
Television shows filmed in Italy
Television shows filmed in Switzerland
Television shows filmed in France
Television shows filmed in England
Television shows filmed in Utah